This is a list of people who have served as mayor of the city of Shreveport, Louisiana.

See also
 Timeline of Shreveport, Louisiana

Notes

On December 8, 2018, Adrian D. Perkins was elected Mayor of Shreveport and will succeed Ollie Tyler on December 29, 2018.

External links 
Mayor of Shreveport Page
Shreveport Mayoral Trivia

Shreveport

Mayorsshreveport